Jazz Way Out is an album by jazz musicians Wilbur Harden and John Coltrane, the second of three 1958 Savoy recordings featuring Harden and Coltrane together as leaders. The session also produced an alternate take of "Dial Africa", which can be found on some compilations, most notably the ones featuring the complete Savoy recordings made by Harden and Coltrane together, The Complete Mainstream 1958 Sessions (2009) and The Complete Savoy Sessions (1999).

Track listing
 "Dial Africa" (Wilbur Harden) — 8:42
 "Oomba" (Wilbur Harden) — 5:31
 "Gold Coast" (Curtis Fuller) — 14:34

Personnel
 John Coltrane — tenor saxophone
 Wilbur Harden — trumpet/flugelhorn
 Curtis Fuller — trombone
 Tommy Flanagan — piano
 Ali Jackson — bass
 Art Taylor — drums

References

1958 albums
John Coltrane albums
Savoy Records albums
Wilbur Harden albums